Upland station is at 300 East A Street in Upland, California, just east of Euclid Ave. It has 170 free parking spaces.  The station is part of the Metrolink commuter railway's San Bernardino Line.

The station is owned by the City of Upland. Omnitrans does not directly serve the station, but runs route 83 along Euclid Avenue.

Both bus and rail service run 7 days a week.

References

External links 
 
 Omnitrans

Metrolink stations in San Bernardino County, California
Upland, California
Railway stations in the United States opened in 1993
1993 establishments in California